The Mouse Guard Roleplaying Game is a tabletop role-playing game created by Luke Crane based on the Mouse Guard comics and his own Burning Wheel system. Boom! Studios' imprint Archaia Entertainment released a second edition of the game on 3 November 2015.

The Game

The game itself has been released in two editions - a hardback in 2008 and a deluxe boxed set was brought out in 2011.

Setting

Mouse Guard is a pseudo-medieval setting about an order of anthropomorphic mouse rangers.  The setting itself was written by David Petersen in a series of Eisner award winning comics.  Many details of the setting such as "How does a mouse become a member of the Mouse Guard" were fleshed out specifically for the RPG.

System

The game system is a simplified version of the Burning Wheel system, using standard six-sided dice, with each result of a 4-6 being a success.  Each character has an overriding belief, an immediate goal, and an instinct that guides them, all with mechanical weight.

Reception
Critical reception was strong, with the Mouse Guard Roleplaying Game winning numerous industry awards. It won the 2008 Origins Award for best roleplaying game and numerous Indie RPG awards, as well as being silver winner for three ENnies and shortlisted for the 2009 Diana Jones Award.

Tor.com called it "a fantastic game which challenges players imagination and creativity".

The 2011 Box Set was called "easily the most beautiful RPG I have ever laid eyes on" by Wired.

References

ENnies winners
Furry role-playing games
Origins Award winners
Role-playing games based on comics